Mary Magdalene is a 2018 biblical drama film about the woman of the same name, written by Helen Edmundson and Philippa Goslett and directed by Garth Davis. It stars Rooney Mara, Joaquin Phoenix, Chiwetel Ejiofor, and Tahar Rahim.

The film had its world premiere at the National Gallery in London on February 26, 2018. It was released in the United Kingdom on March 16, 2018, by Universal Pictures, in Australia on March 22, 2018, by Transmission Films, and in the United States on April 12, 2019, by IFC Films. It is the last film score completed by composer Jóhann Jóhannsson before his death.

Plot
In the year AD 30 when Judea was under the control of the Roman Empire, a woman named Mary from the small town of Magdala begins to follow Jesus of Nazareth. Her family and father try to interfere with her departing from her home, but she sends them away. She accepts baptism from Jesus and accepts his charge for her and the other apostles to baptize in the name of the Father. She appears to be fully as one with the other apostles in asserting the authority of the spirit of Jesus working through her on behalf of the followers of Jesus.

This causes conflict with the other male disciples, including Saint Peter. Mary follows Jesus all the way to the Crucifixion and Resurrection. In the end she is accepted by Peter as a faithful follower of Jesus. Peter accepts her report of the Resurrection and encourages the other apostles to accept her message. 

In the closing captions, Mary is first identified as having been wrongly called a common prostitute by the early church in the first millennium. In the third millennium, she has come to be accepted as one of the followers of Jesus who was among the twelve apostles and together with them.

Cast

 Rooney Mara as Mary Magdalene
 Joaquin Phoenix as Jesus of Nazareth
 Chiwetel Ejiofor as Peter
 Tahar Rahim as Judas
 Sarah-Sofie Boussnina as Martha, Mary's friend
 Hadas Yaron as Sarah
 Lubna Azabal as Susannah
 Lior Raz as Magdala Community Leader
 Ryan Corr as Joseph
 Tchéky Karyo as Elisha, Mary's father
 Jacopo Olmo Antinori as Magdala Man
 Shira Haas as Leah
 Uri Gavriel as Philip
 David Schofield as Thomas
 Charles Babalola as Andrew
 Tawfeek Barhom as James
 Tzachi Halevy as Ephraim, a potential suitor for Mary
 Zohar Strauss as John
 Michael Moshonov as Matthew
 Ariane Labed as Rachel
 Theo Theodoridis as Lazarus
 Denis Ménochet as Daniel, Mary's brother
 Irit Sheleg as Mary, Jesus's mother

Production
In February 2016, Rooney Mara joined the cast of the film portraying the titular role of Mary Magdalene, with Garth Davis directing the film, Universal Pictures, Film4 Productions and See-Saw Films will co-produce the film, with Iain Canning and Emile Sherman serving as producers. In April 2016, Mara's partner Joaquin Phoenix was in talks to portray the role of Jesus Christ. In July 2016, Chiwetel Ejiofor and Tahar Rahim joined the cast of the film. In September 2016, Hadas Yaron joined the cast of the film. Hildur Guðnadóttir and Jóhann Jóhannsson composed the film's score, the latter's final score before his death in February 2018.

Principal photography began on October 3, 2016 and concluded on December 2, 2016. The film was shot in Rome and in multiple locations in Southern Italy including Matera in Basilicata, Gravina in Puglia in Apulia, Trapani in Sicily and Naples in Campania.

Release
In February 2016, it was reported that The Weinstein Company would distribute the film. It was originally scheduled to be released in the United States and Canada on November 24, 2017. In August 2017, the release was pushed back to March 30, 2018. In January 2018, it was pulled from the schedule. In March 2018, it was announced The Weinstein Company would no longer distribute the film, and the producers were attempting to find another distributor to release the film. IFC Films distributed the film in the United States on April 12, 2019.

The film had its world premiere at the National Gallery in London on February 26, 2018. It screened at the Audi Dublin International Film Festival on February 28, 2018. It was released in Australia on March 22, 2018.

Reception
The site's critics consensus reads, "Mary Magdalene has obvious reverence for its subject; unfortunately, it lacks enough momentum or depth of character to make her story interesting." At Metacritic, the film has a weighted average score of 48 out of 100, based on 24 critics, indicating "mixed or average reviews".

Nick Allen of RogerEbert.com gave Mary Magdalene 4 stars, calling it "an extraordinary film" and writing that it "moved me in a way that no previous film about Christianity ever has."

Accolades

References

External links
 
 
 

Portrayals of Mary Magdalene in film
2018 films
2018 drama films
American drama films
British drama films
Australian drama films
Helen Edmundson
Film4 Productions films
Films shot in Matera
Universal Pictures films
Portrayals of Jesus in film
Films scored by Hildur Guðnadóttir
Films scored by Jóhann Jóhannsson
Films produced by Liz Watts
Films produced by Iain Canning
Films produced by Emile Sherman
Focus Features films
IFC Films films
Films based on the Gospels
Films set in the 1st century
Films set in the Roman Empire
Films about Christianity
2010s English-language films
2010s American films
2010s British films
Cultural depictions of Mary Magdalene